Mesle Mah is a special iftar program of IRIB TV3, Hosted By Resalat Bouzari, which airs daily with a positive, kind and hopeful approach and focuses on issues such as self-sacrifice and forgiveness during the month of Ramadan from 19:00 until around the Maghrib Adhan. This program replaced Mah-e Asal in Ramadan 2020. This program narrates the lives of the guests invited to the program; Guests from all over the country attend the event and talk about their life events.

The guests of the program are usually those who have a story to tell. An event that has affected their lives and taken on the color and smell of God and somehow brought them closer to God.

Inviting different personalities, making social and spiritual items, and introducing the virtues of Ali al-Ridha, along with playing a short film of these virtues, are other parts of this special program of IRIB TV3.

Title music

Summary of seasons

Margins

Criticism of replacement with Mah-e Asal 
After replacing Mesle Mah with Mah-e Asal and also making similar Mah-e Asal programs on IRIB networks during Ramadan 2020, there were criticisms of such programs and TV managers that make the replacement of popular and successful programs without the necessary quality. Part of the criticism was that in Ramadan 2020, every network made a program in the format of the Mah-e Asal and the presenter tried to perform like Ehsan Alikhani, but they failed.

Responding to the criticism, the host, Resalat Bouzari, said:

References 

Iranian television shows
Islamic Republic of Iran Broadcasting original programming
Television talk shows
Persian-language television shows
Ramadan special television shows